Andrew Stuart Podger,  (born 6 November 1948) is a retired Australian senior public servant. He is currently Professor of Public Policy at the Australian National University.

Early life
Podger was born 6 November 1948.

Public service career
Podger began his Commonwealth Public Service career in 1968 as a Cadet at the Australian Bureau of Statistics. After his time as a statistician he moved to the Social Welfare Commission in 1974 and then to the Department of Prime Minister and Cabinet in 1975. He was promoted to the Senior Executive Service in the Department of Social Security in 1978, where he stayed until 1982.

In 1982 he joined the Department of Finance. In 1990 Podger went on to hold the position of Deputy Secretary in charge of Acquisition and Logistics in the Department of Defence, where he stayed until 1993.

He was appointed Secretary of the Department of the Arts and Administrative Services in 1993, shortly thereafter renamed the Department of Administrative Services He was appointed Secretary of the Department of Housing and Regional Development in April 1994. He then became Secretary of the Department of Health and Family Services in 1996 (later Health and Aged Care).

He then was appointed the Public Service Commissioner in 2002, a role he continued until 2004 when he agreed to head a Task Force in the Department of the Prime Minister and Cabinet to examine how to improve the delivery of health services.

Awards
Podger was appointed an Officer of the Order of Australia (AO) in 2004.

Notes

References and further reading

1948 births
Living people
Australian public servants
University of Sydney alumni
Officers of the Order of Australia
Secretaries of the Australian Government Health Department